Mt. Desolation is the debut studio album by English alt country duo Mt. Desolation, released on 18 October 2010 in the United Kingdom and on 19 October 2010 in the US. This is the first album by the side project of the band Keane's Tim Rice-Oxley and Jesse Quin.

Track listing 
 All tracks written by Tim Rice-Oxley and Jesse Quin

Bonus songs 
Most pressings of the CD only include 11 songs ("Halo of Fireflies", hidden after "Coming Home", is not listed on the back), however some extra songs have been released, either on special pressings of the CD, or digitally.

 The Barnes & Noble version of the album includes 2 bonus tracks, "Emily" and the demo for "Bitter Pill".
 The iTunes version has "Wherever You Were Going" listed as track 11.
 The Amazon MP3 version has "Coming Home" and "Halo of Fireflies" listed as two separate tracks, and includes "Pushed Around" as track 12.
 The song "Your Kind of Life" is part of the live setlist of most Mt. Desolation gigs, but has not been officially released.

Reception 

The album was met with generally favourable reviews, with The Guardian thinking of it, when compared to Keane's Night Train, as a "more convincing vehicle for their undisputed melodic gifts" and citing "Bitter Pill" as a highlight.

BBC Music called the production "fittingly delicate and unfussy, with no oppressive effects" and commented on the singer's voices, saying "Rice-Oxley and Quin [...] both sound a little shy", but welcoming the "intermittent, effortlessly harmonising female vocals".

Virgin.com, however, wasn't as enthusiastic, giving the album a 6 out of 10, describing their self-titled debut as "a mixed bag of charming country inspired tunes and hard to take seriously line dancing tracks", before adding that "the self gratifying love for the music that has been created makes this collaborative country collection well worth a listen despite the odd rogue."

Personnel 
Mt Desolation:
Tim Rice-Oxley - vocals, piano, synths, composition
Jesse Quin - vocals, lead guitar, composition

Support musicians:
Fimbo – drums
Jessica Staveley-Taylor – backing vocals, acoustic guitar, piano
John-William Scott – bass, guitar
Phil Renna – fiddle, keyboards

Guest artists:
Ronnie Vannucci - drums, guitars, vibes
"Country" Winston Marshall - banjo
Charity Quin - backing vocals
Jayne Rice-Oxley - backing vocals
Francois Deville - pedal steel
Andrew Lowe – bass
John Roderick – backing vocals, guitar
Pete Roe – keyboards, backing vocals
Tom Hobden – fiddle

Chart performance

References 

2010 debut albums
Mt. Desolation albums
Keane (band)
Island Records albums
Cherrytree Records albums